Al Hadi Bani Wahb is a sub-district located in As Sawadiyah District, Al Bayda Governorate, Yemen. Al Hadi Bani Wahb had a population of 4047 according to the 2004 census.

References 

Sub-districts in As Sawadiyah District